Bernard "Punching Postman" Paul (born October 22, 1965) is a Mauritian/British professional light welter/welter/light middleweight boxer of the 1990s and 2000s who won the British Boxing Board of Control (BBBofC) Southern (England) Area light welterweight title, and Commonwealth light welterweight title, and was a challenger for the World Boxing Organization (WBO) Inter-Continental light welterweight title against Jon Thaxton, British Boxing Board of Control (BBBofC) British light welterweight title against Mark Winters, and World Boxing Organization (WBO) Inter-Continental light welterweight title against Ricky Hatton, his professional fighting weight varied from , i.e. light welterweight to , i.e. light middleweight.

References

External links

1965 births
Light-middleweight boxers
Light-welterweight boxers
Living people
Mauritian male boxers
Place of birth missing (living people)
Boxers from Greater London
Welterweight boxers
British male boxers